Landis Arnold (born August 6, 1960) is an American former ski jumper who competed in the 1984 Winter Olympics.

References

1960 births
Living people
American male ski jumpers
Olympic ski jumpers of the United States
Ski jumpers at the 1984 Winter Olympics
Sportspeople from Boulder, Colorado